Javier Hurtado Domínguez (born 1981) is a Spanish politician. On 7 September 2020, he was appointed minister of tourism, commerce and consumption in the Basque Government led by Iñigo Urkullu. He is affiliated with the Socialist Party of the Basque Country–Basque Country Left party.

References 

Living people
1981 births
Place of birth missing (living people)
Socialist Party of the Basque Country–Basque Country Left politicians
Government ministers of the Basque Country (autonomous community)
Autonomous University of Madrid alumni
Politicians from the Community of Madrid